Joseph John McGrail (born June 6, 1964) is a former American football nose tackle who played for one season in the National Football League (NFL). After playing college football for the Delaware Fightin' Blue Hens, he was drafted by the Buffalo Bills in the 12th round of the 1987 NFL Draft. He played in two games for the Bills in 1987.

1964 births
Living people
Players of American football from Philadelphia
American football defensive tackles
Delaware Fightin' Blue Hens football players
Buffalo Bills players